South African Post Office (SA Post Office) is the national postal service of South Africa and as a state owned enterprise, its only shareholder is the South African government. In terms of South African law, the Post Office is the only entity that is legally allowed to accept reserved mail, and as such, it operates a monopoly.
It employs over 16,480 people and operates more than 1,400 postal outlets throughout the country and therefore has a presence in almost every single town and city in South Africa. Nomkhita Mona joined the SA Post Office in April 2021 as group CEO.  Its main subsidiary is Postbank, a financial services provider.

History

The history of postal services in Southern Africa can be traced back over 500 years. In 1500, the captain of a Portuguese ship, Petro D'Ataide, placed a letter in a milkwood tree at Mossel Bay. He reported the sinking of three ships in his fleet, including that of Bartolomeu Dias, during a heavy storm over the Atlantic Ocean. Portuguese ships regularly stopped at Mossel Bay to take on fresh water, and three months later, the letter was found and delivered to Portugal. Sailors travelling to or from the Orient past the south coast of Africa, placed letters under postal stones, hoping that they would be found and delivered by other ships.

On 2 March 1792 the acting governor of the Cape, Johan Isaac Rhenius, opened a post office in a room next to the pantry at the Castle of Good Hope in Cape Town. This was the start of what became the South African Post Office (SAPO). By 1805, there was a regular inland mail service between Algoa Bay and False Bay in the Cape, using farmers on horseback. A mail wagon ran twice a week between Cape Town and the town of Stellenbosch. In 1806, Sir David Baird ruled that Khoi, enslaved indigenous people of the Cape, would be used to convey letters and small packages. A mail boat service was introduced between England and the Cape in 1815 and in 1848, the then Transvaal government appointed postmen to transport official mail. Prior to this development mail had been sent by special messenger, or by any available transport. The first stamp issued in South Africa was the Cape Triangular stamp introduced in 1853. The stamp has two values – the four pence blue and the one penny red. In 1860, the first postboxes were erected in the Cape and several railway lines were completed and used to transport mail. The first mail train was introduced in 1883.

In 1867, diamonds were discovered in South Africa, and in 1905, the largest diamond in the world, the Cullinan, was sent to London as a normal recorded postal article. Mail was transported by motor car for the first time in 1911, and SAPO experimented using camels to deliver mail, replacing them with an ox cart service in 1914. In December 1911, the first air mail delivery took place with a seven-and-a-half minute flight from Kenilworth in Cape Town to Muizenberg. The mail was carried in the same model of aircraft as that used two years earlier by Louis Bleriot to cross the English Channel.

By 1919, there was a regular motor car service, and a regular air-mail service was introduced the same year. The first overseas air-mail service was introduced in 1932, and the Springbok Air Service was introduced between the Union of South Africa and Britain in 1945. The first definitive stamp series of the Republic of South Africa was issued on 31 May 1961 after South Africa withdrew from the Commonwealth because of its apartheid policies at the time.

In 1973, postcodes were introduced to facilitate automated mail sorting and standardised letters were introduced later that year. In 1994, South Africa was readmitted to the Universal Postal Union following the end of minority rule. SAPO currently operates under a 25-year license granted by the Independent Communication Authority of South Africa (ICASA) and as such must provide a universal service to all the citizens of the country.

Current activities

The South African Post Office Group currently consist of a number of divisions and subsidiaries operating in the fields of mail, financial services, logistics, property, electronic commerce and retail services. Traditional collection, sorting and delivery of letters and parcels constitute the primary business activity of the group, responsible for nearly 65% of the groups revenue in 2010/12. In the 2010/11 financial year nearly 1,5 billion mail pieces were processed. To process and distribute this volume of mail items the group operates 6 large mail centres and more than 40 depots across the republic. The group has, however, suffered a decline in traditional mail volumes over the last 3 years. This decline is in line with similar declines experienced by the majority of postal operators across the world as traditional mail as a communication medium is substituted by electronic alternatives such as email and more recently cell phones.  

In 2021 the parcel delivery both locally and internationally is unreliable and delays of more than six months are common. Overseas Christmas cards normally reach their destination in March. In an attempt to regain lost market share of the postal delivery market, the Post Office proposed that legislation be passed requiring that all packages weighing 1kg or less be delivered by it. If passed, this would give the Post Office a government enforced monopoly over the delivery of small packages. 

The second largest activity of the group is financial services which it offers through its savings banks that operates under the name Postbank. The Postbank itself was formed in 1910 and is the largest savings bank in the country. More than 6 million customers have accounts with Postbank making it one of the largest banks in South Africa as measured by customer number. The Postbank is a deposit taking institution only, and thus does not offer credit products, only savings and investment products.

See also
NamPost

References 
 Citations

External links
 South African Post Office Official Website
 EMS South Africa
 Speed Services Website

Communications in South Africa
Government-owned companies of South Africa
Postal organizations